Mladen Rakčević (born 10 February 1982) is a Montenegrin former handball player.

Career
During his career, Rakčević played for Lovćen (2000–2005), Vardar (2005–2009), Kolubara (2009–2010), Metalurg Skopje (2010–2013), AEK Athens (2013–2014), HCM Constanța (2014–2015) and Dobrogea Sud Constanța (2015–2018).

At international level, Rakčević represented Montenegro at the 2013 World Men's Handball Championship. He also participated in two European Championships (2008 and 2014).

Honours
Lovćen
 Handball League of FR Yugoslavia: 2000–01
Vardar
 Macedonian Handball Super League: 2006–07, 2008–09
 Macedonian Handball Cup: 2006–07, 2007–08
Kolubara
 Serbian Handball Super League: 2009–10
 Serbian Handball Cup: 2009–10
Metalurg Skopje
 Macedonian Handball Super League: 2010–11, 2011–12
 Macedonian Handball Cup: 2010–11, 2012–13
AEK Athens
 Greek Men's Handball Cup: 2013–14
Dobrogea Sud Constanța
 Cupa României: 2017–18

References

External links
 EHF record

1982 births
Living people
Sportspeople from Cetinje
Montenegrin male handball players
RK Vardar players
RK Kolubara players
Expatriate handball players
Montenegrin expatriate sportspeople in North Macedonia
Montenegrin expatriate sportspeople in Serbia
Montenegrin expatriate sportspeople in Greece
Montenegrin expatriate sportspeople in Romania